Jason Wayne Sparrow (born 7 February 1974) is a former Zimbabwean cricketer. Born in Chipinge, he played three first-class matches for his home province Manicaland during the 1999–2000 Logan Cup.

References

External links
 
 

1974 births
Living people
Sportspeople from Manicaland Province
Manicaland cricketers
Zimbabwean cricketers